Kelly Zajac (born June 6, 1988) is a Canadian former professional ice hockey player. He played for the Union Dutchmen in the NCAA Men's Division I ECAC Hockey conference and in the American Hockey League for the Albany Devils, Manitoba Moose and Hershey Bears.

Playing career
After finishing his collegiate hockey career with Union College, Zajac signed as a free agent with the AHL's Albany Devils in 2011. In August 2015, Zajac left the Devils organization and signed a one-year contract with Finnish Liiga club, Lukko, which included an initial two month try-out.  Three months later, Zajac returned to the AHL after signing with the Manitoba Moose. The Moose released Zajac on February 12, 2016 after which Zajac signed with the South Carolina Stingrays.

Zajac originally opted to return to Europe for a second season in agreeing to a contract with Tingsryds AIF, however on May 22, 2016, Zajac decided to stay in North America after the conclusion of the 2015–16 season with the Stingrays. He then signed a two-way contract with the Hershey Bears and Stingrays for the 2016–17 season.

Personal life
Kelly is the younger brother of professional hockey players Travis and Darcy Zajac.  Their youngest brother, Nolan, played with the NCAA Denver Pioneers.  Their father, Tom, also played for the University of Denver.

Career statistics

Awards and honours

References

External links 

1988 births
Living people
Albany Devils players
Canadian ice hockey forwards
Hershey Bears players
Lukko players
Manitoba Moose players
Salmon Arm Silverbacks players
South Carolina Stingrays players
Ice hockey people from Winnipeg
Trenton Titans players
Union Dutchmen ice hockey players
Canadian expatriate ice hockey players in Finland